The Malta (subtitled "Quotidiano nazionalista"), sometimes also known as Gazzetta Maltese, was an Italian-language newspaper founded in 1883 in British Malta.

History 
Fortunato Mizzi founded the newspaper as an Italian-language press outlet in Malta, at the time a British colony.

In the 1920s and 1930s, the Malta, led by Enrico Mizzi, son of Fortunato, was the press outlet of the Italophiles Maltese irredentists gathered in the Partito Nazionalista.

Following the entry of Italy into World War II, in June 1940 the newspaper was transferred to Rome, where it was written by irredentist emigrants. Published by Calogero Tumminelli, its frequency changed from daily to fortnightly. It stopped its publications in July 1943.

References 

Italian irredentism
History of Malta
1883 establishments in Malta
1943 disestablishments in Italy
Defunct newspapers published in Malta
Italian-language newspapers
Newspapers established in 1883
Publications disestablished in 1943